Jinshanwei is a railway station on the Jinshan railway of the Shanghai Suburban Railway located in Jinshan District, Shanghai. It opened for intercity passenger service on September 28, 2012. Jinshanwei currently has four platforms. The station serves both express and local service trains. In April 2013, a Park and ride scheme was introduced,  encouraging commuters to park their cars at the station and continue their travels by train to downtown Shanghai.

Jinshanwei station is within walking distance of Jinshan City Beach, one of the few beaches within the city boundaries of Shanghai, as well as the historic Jinshanzui Fishing Village, billed as 'the last Fishing Village in Shanghai'.

References 

Railway stations in Shanghai
Railway stations in China opened in 2012
Stations on the Jinshan railway